The Johnstown Colonial Cemetery is a historic cemetery and national historic district located at West Green and North Market Street in Johnstown, Fulton County, New York. The district contains one contributing site and two contributing structures.

The cemetery was established in 1766, and the district was listed on the National Register of Historic Places in 1998.

References

External links
 
 

Cemeteries on the National Register of Historic Places in New York (state)
Historic districts on the National Register of Historic Places in New York (state)
1766 establishments in the Province of New York
Cemeteries in Fulton County, New York
National Register of Historic Places in Fulton County, New York